The Wampus cat is a cat-like creature in American folklore that varies widely in appearance, ranging from frightful to comical, depending on region.

Description
Early references, by the American Dialect Society, noted the Wampus cat as "a creature heard whining about camps at night," "a spiritual green-eyed cat, having occult powers," or "an undefined imaginary animal." Folklorist Vance Randolph described the Wampus cat as "a kind of amphibious panther which leaps into the water and swims like a colossal mink." Other commentators liken the Wampus cat to a creature of Cherokee mythology.

In Cherokee legends, the monster is the cat-like embodiment of a female onlooker cursed by tribal elders, as punishment for hiding beneath the pelt of a wild cat to witness a sacred ceremony. The Wampus cat is used as a mascot for several educational institutions. During the 1920–30s, newspapers reported a "Wampus" cat killing livestock in North Carolina to Georgia. Though possibly due to early intrusions of coyotes or jaguarundi, the livestock deaths were attributed to the Wampus cat.

Examples
The Wampus cat is the mascot of the following:

 Clark Fork Junior/Senior High School, Clark Fork, Idaho – seen as a yellow cougar with a spiked ball on its tail akin to legends of the ball-tailed cat.
 Conway Junior High/ High School, Conway, Arkansas – seen as a six-legged swamp cat. Described by locals as "a mountain lion with six legs: four for running at the speed of light, and two for fighting with all its might."
 Atoka High School, Atoka, Oklahoma
 Itasca High School, Itasca, Texas
 Leesville High School, Leesville, Louisiana
 The Uwharrie Wampus Cats, a wood-bat baseball team in Albemarle, North Carolina
 The Wampus cat has been associated in several South-Eastern tribal beliefs as a shape-shifter. One can find the story in Cherokee folklore.

In popular culture
 A musical ensemble who recorded several tracks in 1937 and 1938, and consisting of six or seven string musicians including Oscar "Buddy" Woods, were billed as "the Wampus Cats".
 J. K. Rowling's Pottermore story History of Magic in North America lists the Wampus cat as a source for hair used in magic wands. The American School of Witchcraft and Wizardry, Ilvermorny, also has named one of its four houses for the mythical beast.
 Strangeways Brewing in Virginia brews a beer named after the cat.
 In the Cormac McCarthy novel The Orchard Keeper, the character Uncle Ather tells stories about Wampus cats, or "painters".
 In the Roald Dahl novel James and the Giant Peach, the police officers and firemen of New York City mistook the Centipede for a Wampus.
 In Skylanders: Imaginators, the Skylander Sensei Mysticat is a sphinx who evokes the traits of the Wampus cat.
 Kobold Press converted the Wampus cat into a monster for Dungeons & Dragons 5th Edition in its sourcebook Tome of Beasts. These Wampus cats appear as female mountain lions with the heads of human, trollkin, orc, or goblin women and are created through curses leveled by shamans upon women who practice forbidden magic. Possessing the ability to enthrall others with their voice, Wampus cats despise all men, but especially holy men, priests, and shamans, whom they seek to kill in retribution for their fate.
 Pardon My Take, a sports podcast, used the Wampus cat as a euphemism for consuming a large amount of chewing tobacco as a punishment for mistakenly predicting a “whomping” in the 2022 NBA Playoff series between the Boston Celtics and the Brooklyn Nets.

References

External links
 Catawampus on Wiktionary
 Map of Wampus Cats High School Mascots

Fearsome critters
Tennessee culture
Mythological felines
Fictional cats
High school mascots
Cat folklore